John Finucane (born 1980) is an Irish lawyer, footballer, and Sinn Féin politician. He has been the Member of Parliament (MP) for the Belfast North constituency of the House of Commons of the United Kingdom since the 2019 general election.

Early life
Finucane is the son of the Irish lawyer Pat Finucane, who was murdered in 1989 at his family home by loyalist paramilitaries, a murder that BBC News called "one of the most controversial killings during The Troubles". Finucane's father was a Roman Catholic from west Belfast, whilst his mother came from a Protestant family in east Belfast. Several of Finucane's close relatives on his father side were members of the Irish Republican Army.

Political career

At the 2017 United Kingdom general election Finucane contested the Belfast North parliamentary constituency for Sinn Féin; the sitting MP was Nigel Dodds of the Democratic Unionist Party. Finucane secured Sinn Féin's highest vote share ever in the constituency but failed to unseat Dodds. Former Provisional IRA member Sean Kelly, who was convicted of nine counts of murder for his role in the Shankill Road bombing in 1993, canvassed for Finucane in the election.

In 2019, Finucane ran for Belfast City Council in the Castle constituency. Also on the ballot were his former St Malachy's College classmates Mal O'Hara of the Green Party and Carl Whyte of the SDLP. Finucane won 1,650 votes, placing him second in the poll behind Nuala McAllister of the Alliance Party. He was consequently elected as a councillor.

Finucane was elected as Lord Mayor of Belfast in May 2019. Shortly after being elected Lord Mayor at Belfast City Hall, he was informed by the Police Service of Northern Ireland that loyalists had made credible threats to his life and planned to attack his family home. Finucane remarked "I am committed to serving and representing all the people of this city and I will not be deterred from that by threats from anyone." The next day, he welcomed Charles, Prince of Wales to the city whilst he was on an official visit.

Whilst serving as Lord Mayor of Belfast Finucane was issued with a Community Resolution Notice by the Police Service of Northern Ireland for a public indecency offence. He was issued this after urinating in public on a Belfast City Centre street. 

Mr Finucane confirmed he had accepted a community resolution notice for indecent behaviour and stated:

"I am of course very embarrassed and deeply sorry about this incident and I apologise unreservedly,"

At the 2019 United Kingdom general election Finucane again contested Belfast North, winning the seat with 23,078 votes to Dodds' 21,135. He is the first Irish nationalist MP in the history of the constituency.

When Sky News revealed Westminster Accounts in January 2023, Fincucane was shown to be the highest earning Northern Irish MP outside of Westminster pay. Most of his secondary earnings came from his work as a solicitor with Belfast law firm Finucane Toner.

Personal life
Finucane serves as goalkeeper and captain of GAA's Lámh Dhearg GAC. He has four children.

References

Living people
Lawyers from Northern Ireland
Sinn Féin MPs (post-1921)
Lord Mayors of Belfast
Lámh Dhearg Gaelic footballers
UK MPs 2019–present
Members of the Parliament of the United Kingdom for Belfast constituencies (since 1922)
Sinn Féin councillors in Northern Ireland
1980 births